Callum McLachlan (born 17 May 1999) is a New Zealand cricketer. He made his first-class debut on 7 November 2021, for Wellington in the 2021–22 Plunket Shield season. Prior to his first-class debut, he was named in New Zealand's squad for the 2018 Under-19 Cricket World Cup.

References

External links
 

1999 births
Living people
New Zealand cricketers
Wellington cricketers
Place of birth missing (living people)